The Falkirk and District Tramways operated a tramway service in Falkirk between 1905 and 1936.

History

The company started services on 21 October 1905. The company obtained most its initial tramcars from the Compagnie Générale de Construction of St Denis, France. Three others were obtained from Brush.

Closure

The Scottish Motor Traction Company took over the company in 1935, and the tramway services were closed on 21 July 1936 in favour of its own bus services.

Tramcar 14 survived and is now restored and in the custody of Falkirk Museums.

References

External links
 Falkirk and District Tramways Company at the British Tramway Company Badges and Buttons website.

Tram transport in Scotland
4 ft gauge railways in Scotland